Promyrmekiaphila winnemem is a species of wafer-lid trapdoor spider in the family Euctenizidae. It is found in the United States.

References

Euctenizidae
Articles created by Qbugbot
Spiders described in 2008